Cape Lovitt is the westernmost point of New Zealand. It is located on the west coast of Auckland Island, one of New Zealand's subantarctic outlying islands, 3 kilometres north of the mouth of Western Arm, a channel leading into Carnley Harbour and separating Auckland Island from Adams Island.

 

Landforms of the Auckland Islands
Headlands of the New Zealand outlying islands
Extreme points of New Zealand